Turtle in July is a 1989 children's picture book by Marilyn Singer and it is illustrated by Jerry Pinkney. It comprises a collection of animal poems and what they each experience during various times of the year.

Reception
A review of Turtle in July by Booklist, called it "both fresh and engaging", noted "The animal poems, framed by the seasons of the year, are sharply evocative", and recommended it " for both poetry and nature units."

Turtle in July has also been reviewed by School Library Journal, and Publishers Weekly,

Awards
1989 CCBC Choice
1989 New York Times 10 Best Illustrated Books of the Year
1993 National Council of Teachers of English (NCTE) Adventuring with Books book

References

External links

Library holdings of Turtle in July

1989 children's books
1989 poetry books
American picture books
American poetry collections
Children's poetry books
Books about turtles
Picture books by Jerry Pinkney